Jack Power may refer to:
Jack Power (Marvel Comics), a fictional character in Marvel Comics' universe
Jack Power (Ulysses), fictional character in the novel Ulysses
Jack Power (hurler) (1891–?), Irish hurler
Jack Power (politician) (1883–1925), Australian politician
Jack Power (footballer) (1910–1988), Australian rules footballer

See also 
Johnny Powers (disambiguation)
John Power (disambiguation)
John Powers (disambiguation)
Jack Powers (1827–1860), Irish-American gambler and gang leader
Jon Powers (born 1978), American political activist